Atari's Dominos is a one, two or four-player video action game packaged in its own distinctively styled upright cabinet that rest directly on the floor.

Gameplay
Gameplay is a variation of the snake genre, in which players compete by surrounding each other with lines of dominos.  Players change direction via a set of four directional buttons representing up, down, right, and left respectively. A player loses when they hit a wall, their own dominos, or their opponent's, at which point all the dominos in their line "fall" down. At the end of each round, a point is awarded to the winner of that round until the end point goal is reached. The point goal can be 3, 4, 5, or 6 points.

Development
A 23-inch TV monitor is mounted in the top front of the cabinet, with the monitor viewing screen tilted back from vertical. The TV monitor viewing screen is covered with plexiglas panel. Dominos came in an upright two-player cabinet as well as a four-player cocktail cabinet.  All cabinets were produced in 1976 and originally released in 1977.

References

Arcade video games
Arcade-only video games
1977 video games
Atari arcade games
Snake video games
Video games developed in the United States